Tahmeed Ahmed is a Bangladeshi Scientist with a particular research focus on Gastroenterology, Public Health Nutrition, and Global Health. He is a physician by training with specialization in treating patients with cholera and diarrheal diseases as well as maternal and childhood malnutrition. He has been serving as the Executive Director of the International Centre for Diarrhoeal Disease Research, Bangladesh (icddr,b) since February 1, 2021. He is the first Bangladeshi to serve in the role. 

Dr. Ahmed is also working as a Professor of Public Health Nutrition in the James P. Grant School of Public Health at BRAC University. He is an Affiliate Professor in the Department of Global Health at University of Washington.

Life 
Dr. Ahmed's father was an economist who died while he was a child. His mother encouraged him to pursue a career in medicine. He attended St. Gregory's High School and College and Notre Dame College, Dhaka. Later he completed his Bachelor of Medicine, and Bachelor of Surgery (M.B.B.S) from the Mymensingh Medical College in 1983. He was an in-service trainee majoring in internal medicine at the Mymensingh Medical College Hospital from 1983 to 1984. In 1996, he completed a Ph.D. from the University of Tsukuba.

Career 
Dr. Ahmed joined the International Centre for Diarrhoeal Disease Research, Bangladesh (icddr,b) in 1985 as a medical officer. He has been promoted to the position of Scientist in 2003 and appointed as the Head of Nutrition Programme at International Centre for Diarrhoeal Disease Research, Bangladesh in 2005. Dr. Ahmed became Senior Director of Nutrition and Clinical Services Division at icddr,b on 2015. On February 1, 2021, he succeeded Professor John D. Clemens as the Executive Director of icddr,b. His research works primarily focus on community-based and clinical studies to improve nutritional status of populations particularly children and women and to further optimize management of diarrheal diseases and associated conditions. He is also interested in upstream research using tools to study microbiota, proteome, and metabolome in improving the treatment of nutritional disorders.

Notable works 

 Development of a ready-to-use supplementary food made from locally available food ingredients in Bangladesh
 Development of Microbiota-directed Therapeutic Food (MDCF)

Awards 

 2007 - Development Market Place Award 2007 from the World Bank
 2003 - Dr Sultan Ahmed Choudhury Gold Medal Award from Bangladesh Academy of Sciences

References 

Living people
Year of birth missing (living people)
Place of birth missing (living people)
University of Dhaka alumni
University of Tsukuba alumni
21st-century Bangladeshi people
Bangladeshi biologists
20th-century Bangladeshi physicians
21st-century Bangladeshi physicians
Bangladeshi public health doctors
Physicians from Dhaka
20th-century biologists
21st-century biologists
Physician-scientists